There are a few differing Buddhist views on sin. American Zen author Brad Warner states that in Buddhism there is no concept of sin at all. The Buddha Dharma Education Association also expressly states "The idea of sin or original sin has no place in Buddhism." Zen student and author Barbara O'Brien has said that "Buddhism has no concept of sin." Walpola Rahula also disagreed with the notion of sin, saying "In fact there is no 'sin' in Buddhism, as sin is understood in some religions."

Ethnologist Christoph von Fürer-Haimendorf explained,

Chögyam Trungpa specifically disagreed with the notion of "original sin" saying

Anantarika-karma

Anantarika-karma in Theravada Buddhism is a heinous crime, which through karmic process brings immediate disaster. In Mahayana Buddhism these five crimes are referred to as pañcānantarya (Pāli), and are mentioned in The Sutra Preached by the Buddha on the Total Extinction of the Dharma, They are considered so heinous that a Buddhist or a non Buddhist should avoid them. According to Buddhism committing such a crime would prevent him or her attaining the stages of Sotapanna, Sakadagami, Anagami or Arhat in that lifetime. The five crimes or sins are:
 Injuring a Buddha
 Killing an Arhat
 Creating schism in the society of Sangha   
 Matricide
 Patricide

References

Buddhist belief and doctrine
Sin
Point of view